Craugastor hobartsmithi is a species of frog in the family Craugastoridae.
It is endemic to Mexico.
Its natural habitats are subtropical or tropical dry forests and subtropical or tropical moist montane forests.
It is threatened by habitat loss.

References

hobartsmithi
Amphibians described in 1936
Taxonomy articles created by Polbot